Victor De Lucia (born 28 May 1996) is an Italian football player. He plays for Virtus Entella.

Club career
He made his Serie C debut for Catanzaro on 6 December 2016 in a game against Vibonese.
He made his Serie B debut for Bari on  10 December 2017 in a game against Palermo.

On 2 July 2021, he returned to Frosinone on a two-year contract. On 3 January 2022, he was loaned back to Feralpisalò.

On 29 June 2022, De Lucia signed with Virtus Entella.

References

External links
 

1996 births
Sportspeople from the Province of Caserta
Footballers from Campania
Living people
Italian footballers
Association football goalkeepers
S.S. Racing Club Fondi players
Frosinone Calcio players
Latina Calcio 1932 players
Taranto F.C. 1927 players
U.S. Catanzaro 1929 players
S.S.C. Bari players
FeralpiSalò players
Virtus Entella players
Serie B players
Serie C players
Serie D players